Sari Maeda (born Sari Furuya on 25 May 1990) is a Japanese biathlete. She competed in the 2018 Winter Olympics.

References

1990 births
Living people
Biathletes at the 2018 Winter Olympics
Biathletes at the 2022 Winter Olympics
Japanese female biathletes
Olympic biathletes of Japan
Biathletes at the 2017 Asian Winter Games
Sportspeople from Hokkaido
21st-century Japanese women